Roger Gold may refer to:

Roger Golde (died 1429), English politician

See also
Gold Roger, fictional character